Chegondi Venkata Harirama Jogaiah (born 5 April 1937) was a member of the 14th Lok Sabha of India. He represents the Narasapur constituency of Andhra Pradesh and is a member of the Indian National Congress. He served as Home Minister in NTR Cabinet. He was MLA from Narasapuram (Assembly constituency).

He resigned from Lok sabha and Congress membership on 18 August 2008 and joined new Party started by Chiranjeevi.

Recently he resigned from Praja Rajyam Party (Chiranjeevi Party) and he joined Jai Andhra Movement. 
Later he joined YSR Congress Party, and in March 2014 he resigned from YSR Congress Party.

Now he is not active in politics. He released his political autobiography on 1 November 2015 named "60 vasantala rajakeeya prasthanam" where he wrote all his political experiences till now. This book is released by NTR's daughter Daggubati Purandhareshwari and he dedicated his book to NTR.

References

External links
 Official biographical sketch in Parliament of India website

India MPs 2004–2009
Telugu politicians
1937 births
Living people
Indian National Congress politicians from Andhra Pradesh
Lok Sabha members from Andhra Pradesh
Praja Rajyam Party politicians
YSR Congress Party politicians
Politicians from Palakollu